The  is the 88th operating temple of the Church of Jesus Christ of Latter-day Saints (LDS Church). The temple serves more than 7,700 members in Kyūshū, Okinawa, Yamaguchi, Hiroshima and Shikoku

History
Plans to build a temple in Fukuoka were announced on May 7, 1998. It is the second temple in Japan, the first being dedicated in Tokyo in 1980. Its  site in Chūō-ku is adjacent to the Fukuoka Municipal Zoo and Botanical Gardens, and is also the location of a mission home and offices for the LDS Church. The temple has a single-spire design and the exterior is finished with polished Empress White and Majestic Grey granite from China, very similar to the Snowflake Arizona Temple.

A site dedication and a groundbreaking ceremony for the Fukuoka Japan Temple were held on March 20, 1999. L. Lionel Kendrick, a member of the Seventy and president of the Asia North Area, presided at the ceremony. The temple was open to the public for tours from June 1–3, 2000. Those who toured the  temple were able to see the Celestial room, two ordinance rooms, two sealing rooms and baptistery, and were able to learn more about Mormon beliefs. LDS Church president Gordon B. Hinckley dedicated the Fukuoka Japan Temple on June 11, 2000.

In 2020, the Fukuoka Japan Temple was closed temporarily during the year in response to the coronavirus pandemic.

See also

 Comparison of temples of The Church of Jesus Christ of Latter-day Saints
 List of temples of The Church of Jesus Christ of Latter-day Saints
 List of temples of The Church of Jesus Christ of Latter-day Saints by geographic region
 Temple architecture (LDS Church)
 The Church of Jesus Christ of Latter-day Saints in Japan

References

Additional reading

External links
 
Fukuoka Japan Temple Official site
Fukuoka Japan Temple at ChurchofJesusChristTemples.org
 Japan Fukuoka Temple Photos including construction, dedication and site

20th-century Latter Day Saint temples
Buildings and structures in Fukuoka
Temples (LDS Church) completed in 2000
Religious buildings and structures in Fukuoka Prefecture
Temples (LDS Church) in Japan
The Church of Jesus Christ of Latter-day Saints in Japan
2000 establishments in Japan